Clandestino is the first full-length solo album by Manu Chao, released in 1998. The album contains many soundbites throughout, two of which are bits of a speech by Subcomandante Marcos and, like Chao's subsequent albums, was mostly recorded by the musician himself in various locations around the world, using a small laptop—which is referred to in the liner notes as Estudio Clandestino. The French edition of Rolling Stone magazine named this album the 67th greatest French rock album (out of 100). The album was also included in the book 1001 Albums You Must Hear Before You Die. The album was ranked number 469 in Rolling Stones list of the 500 Greatest Albums of All Time in 2020.

Track listing

Credits

Music 
 Manu Chao: music and lyrics
 Angelo Mancini: trumpet
 Antoine Chao: trumpet
 Jeff Cahours: trombone
 Anouk: vocals 
 Awa Touty Wade: vocals

Production 

Produced by Laurent Lupidi, Renaud Letang, and Manu Chao
Mixed by Cedric Champalou
Mastering by Greg Calbi
Artwork by Frank Loriou, Manu Chao
Photography by Youri Lenquette

Charts

Weekly charts

Year-end charts

Certifications and sales

References

1998 debut albums
Manu Chao albums
Virgin Records albums